Big Brother Greece 1, was the first season of the Greek reality television series Big Brother. The show followed twelve contestants, known as housemates, who were isolated from the outside world for an extended period of time in a custom built House. Each week, one or more of the housemates were evicted by a public vote. The last remaining housemate, Giorgos Triantafyllidis, was declared the winner, winning a cash prize of 50,000,000 GRD.

The season lasted 113 days and was presented by Andreas Mikroutsikos. It launched on ANT1 on September 10, 2001 and ended on December 31, 2001. This season is considered the most successful season out of the three to follow on ANT1, with massive viewership. Its finale on New Year's Eve attracted more than 80% of the television share.

Important personalities from the season include runner-up Prodromos Kathiniotis who later went on to release a studio album and also dab in TV hosting.

Housemates

Nominations Table

References

2001 Greek television seasons
01